Labasheeda is a village in the parish of Kilmurry McMahon in County Clare, Ireland. The village is set on a peninsula on the banks of the Shannon estuary.

Location
The village lies in an indentation of the Shannon Estuary.
It is in the civil parish of Killofin in the barony of Clonderalaw.
Killofin today is part of the Catholic parish of Kilmurry McMahon, in the Roman Catholic Diocese of Killaloe.
The church of St Ciarán's is in Labasheeda.

In 1841 there were 606 people in 108 houses.

Sports

The local Gaelic Athletic Association team is called Shannon Gaels while the local athletics club is called St Marys AC.

Notable people
 Dan Furey - dance teacher and fiddler
 Daniel Gallery - alderman Montreal, Liberal MP and Whip Canada

See also
 List of towns and villages in Ireland

References

Towns and villages in County Clare
Articles on towns and villages in Ireland possibly missing Irish place names